Snooker world rankings 1990/1991: The professional world rankings for the top 32 snooker players and five others from the top 64 in the 1990–91 season are listed below.

References

1990
Rankings 1991
Rankings 1990